John Hatton may refer to:
John Hatton (politician), Australian politician
John Liptrot Hatton, English musical composer
John Hatton (cricketer), English cricketer
John Leigh Smeathman Hatton, mathematician and university administrator
Sir John Hatton, 7th Baronet (died 1740), of the Hatton baronets
Sir John Hatton, 9th Baronet (died 1811), of the Hatton baronets